Pitchford is a small village and civil parish in the English county of Shropshire. It may also refer to:

GWR 4900 Class 4953 Pitchford Hall (built 1929), a railway steam locomotive
Pitchford Hall (erected 1560), a large Grade I listed Tudor country house in the village of Pitchford
Pitchford (surname), people with this surname
Pitchford Thesis [see: current account (balance of payments)], used in economics